Deena Dill is an American actress and television executive producer best known for her recurring roles on Nickelodeon's hit show iCarly, ABC's television series Suburgatory, and The CW's sci-fi series Star-Crossed, as well as being a creator and executive producer of The CW's award-winning game show Oh Sit!, which won the Rose d'Or Award for Best International Game Show.

Early life and education

Deena Dill was born and raised in Dayton, Tennessee, the daughter of business owners James and Phyllis Dill. She was named Deanna Francine Dill at birth, which her parents always pronounced as "Deena". Dill changed the spelling of her first name a few years after college when she joined the Screen Actors Guild. She has a brother, Jim Dill, who graduated from and played baseball at the University of Kentucky. Both Deena and her brother attended Frazier Elementary School, Dayton City School, and Rhea County High School.

Deena graduated cum laude from Vanderbilt University, where she was an NCAA Division I triple jumper and 100-meter hurdler and also a varsity cheerleader. She was named to the SEC Academic Honor roll all four years of college. Dill was elected Homecoming Queen her senior year at Vanderbilt and at graduation was honoured with the Peabody College Outstanding Senior Award. She went on to serve on Vanderbilt University's Peabody College Alumni Board of Directors.

Career

Upon graduation, Deena was offered a modelling contract in Italy. After signing the deal and moving to Milan, she went on to become the face of CornSilk makeup, the legs of Hanes pantyhose, and the body of Gottex Swimwear.

Dill, while in college in Nashville, got her start in television portraying the broken-hearted love interest in over two dozen country music stars' music videos, including Billy Ray Cyrus, Aaron Tippin, and Trace Adkins. After appearing in her first film, Heavyweights (1995), Dill went on to obtain a number of television roles, including appearances in Two and a Half Men, 24, The Weber Show, Becker, ER, and Cracking Up.

In 2005, Deena Dill was cast in the film Coach Carter and then as a recurring character on the television show Boston Legal. Dill transitioned back into television, with roles on Vanished, 3 lbs, Las Vegas, CSI: NY, The Starter Wife, and Drop Dead Diva.

From 2009 to 2010, Dill played the role of Gibby's mom, Charlotte, on Nickelodeon's top rated television show, iCarly. She worked on a number of hit television series such as The Closer, Bones, Army Wives, Awkward, Disney's Good Luck Charlie, and ABC's Scandal.

After a recurring role as Bliss from 2011 to 2013 on ABC's television series Suburgatory, Deena was cast in another recurring role as Margaret Montrose, the mother of Grey Damon, on the new sci fi alien drama Star-Crossed (2014) on The CW.

Dill is one of the creators and executive producers of the CW's game show, Oh Sit!, alongside Phil Gurin and Richard Joel. Oh Sit! won Eurovision's prestigious Rose d'Or Award for Best International Game Show in 2013. The high-stakes, high-octane, extreme musical chairs show was initially picked up for 10 episodes and began airing in the summer of 2012. Oh Sit! moved into its second cycle in early 2013. The hour-long, prime-time competition show is produced by The Gurin Company and 405 Productions, in association with Warner Horizon Television.

In 2017, Dill appeared in The Ballerina, a horror film directed by Steve Pullen.

External links

 
 Blog.zap2it.com
 Hollywoodreporter.com
 Variety.com
 Hollywoodreporter.com
 Hollywoodreporter.com
 Nypost.com
 Variety.com
 Ebu.ch
 Tvguide.com
 Vanderbilt.edu
 Maxtalent.com
 Spoilertv.com

Living people
21st-century American actresses
American film actresses
American television actresses
American women television producers
Female models from Tennessee
Vanderbilt University alumni
Year of birth missing (living people)
People from Dayton, Tennessee
Television producers from Tennessee